St. Catherine's Church also known more formally Church of St. Catherine of Alexandria is a parish of the Roman Catholic Church in Limassol, Cyprus. It falls under the authority of the Latin Patriarchate of Jerusalem.

History 
The church, a three-aisle church with a baroque interior, was built between 1872 and 1879, and was officially opened on the day of the feast of St. Catherine, on 25 November, with the presence of foreign delegations and Governor of British Cyprus. It was designed by Francesco da Monghidoro, an Italian Franciscan. It underwent a restoration in 1979.

Religious services are given in Greek and English.

See also
Catholic Church in Cyprus

References

Roman Catholic churches in Cyprus
Roman Catholic churches completed in 1879
Churches in Limassol
Latin Patriarchate of Jerusalem
19th-century Roman Catholic church buildings